Senator Ballard may refer to:

Charles Ballard (politician) (1836–1891), Connecticut State Senate
David W. Ballard (1824–1883), Oregon State Senate
Deanna Ballard (born 1978), North Carolina State Senate
Don Ballard (1927–2019), Georgia State Senate